Phra Kaeo railway station is a railway station located in Krachio Subdistrict, Phachi District, Phra Nakhon Si Ayutthaya.

Train services 
 Rapid No. 111/112 Bangkok- Den Chai- Bangkok
 Rapid No. 145 Bangkok- Ubon Ratchathani
 Ordinary No. 201/202 Bangkok- Phitsanulok- Bangkok
 Ordinary No. 207/208 Bangkok- Nakhon Sawan- Bangkok
 Ordinary No. 209/210 Bangkok- Ban Takhli- Bangkok
 Commuter No. 301/302 Bangkok- Lop Buri- Bangkok (weekends only)
 Commuter No. 303 Bangkok- Lop Buri (weekdays only)
 Commuter No. 313/314 Bangkok- Ban Phachi Junction- Bangkok (weekdays only)
 Commuter No. 315 Bangkok- Lop Buri (weekdays only)
 Commuter No. 318 Lop Buri- Bangkok (weekdays only)
 Commuter No. 339 Bangkok- Kaeng Khoi Junction (weekdays only)
 Commuter No. 341/342 Bangkok- Kaeng Khoi Junction- Bangkok (weekdays only)
 Commuter No. 343/344 Bangkok- Kaeng Khoi Junction- Bangkok (weekends only)
 Local No. 409 Ayutthaya- Lop Buri

References 
 
 

Railway stations in Thailand